Ninemile Creek is a river on Douglas Island in the City and Borough of Juneau, Alaska, United States. Its origin is in hills to the southeast and it flows northwest to Gastineau Channel near West Juneau.

See also
Fish Creek is a nearby stream on Douglas Island.

References

Rivers of Juneau, Alaska
Rivers of Alaska